Wine Cellars (Spanish: La bodega) is a 1930 French-Spanish film directed by Benito Perojo and starring Colette Darfeuil, Valentín Parera and Enrique Rivero. It was originally made as a silent film, with sound added later. Based on the film's reputation, Perojo was invited to Hollywood to make Spanish-language films for the major studios. It was shot at the Joinville Studios in Paris and on location in Cadiz and Seville. The film's sets were designed by the art director Lucien Carré.

Cast
   María Luz Callejo 
 Joaquín Carrasco 
 Jean Coste as Pablo Dupont  
 Régina Dalthy 
 Colette Darfeuil as La Marquesita  
 Gabriel Gabrio as Fermin  
 Madame Guillaume 
 Valentín Parera as Don Luis  
 Concha Piquer as Maria Luz  
 Enrique Rivero as Raphaël

References

Bibliography
 Bentley, Bernard. A Companion to Spanish Cinema. Boydell & Brewer 2008.

External links 

1930 films
1930s Spanish-language films
Films based on works by Vicente Blasco Ibáñez
Films directed by Benito Perojo
French black-and-white films
Spanish black-and-white films
Films shot at Joinville Studios
Films shot in Spain